Corey Eugene Millen (born March 30, 1964) is an American former professional ice hockey center. He played in the National Hockey League between 1990 and 1997 with five teams. Internationally he played for the American national team at several tournaments, including the 1984 and 1988 Winter Olympics. In 2020, he was named the head coach of the St. Cloud Norsemen in the North American Hockey League.

Career

NHL
Millen played for the University of Minnesota after being selected by the New York Rangers in the 1982 NHL Entry Draft.

Millen started his National Hockey League career with the Rangers in 1990 where he appeared in four games. He also played for the Los Angeles Kings, New Jersey Devils, Dallas Stars and Calgary Flames. He was sent to the Calgary Flames along with Jarome Iginla in the trade which sent Joe Nieuwendyk to the Dallas Stars. He left the NHL after the 1997 season.

Europe
After playing four years with the University of Minnesota, Millen moved to Europe for the first time, where he played in the Swiss Nationalliga A from 1987 to 1989 along with Dale McCourt, wearing the jersey of HC Ambri-Piotta. At the end of this period he moved back to the U.S. where he started his NHL career with the Rangers.

In 1997 Millen joined the Cologne Sharks of Germany's Deutsche Eishockey Liga. He played in Cologne until the end of the 2001–02 season. In 2002–03 he moved to Switzerland and joined HC Lugano of the Nationalliga A for one season and spent a second season with Nationalliga B team EHC Visp before retiring from hockey in 2004.

Coaching
In 2011, Millen became the head coach of the Alaska Avalanche in the North American Hockey League (NAHL). He then was head coach of the Minnesota Wilderness in the NAHL from 2013 to 2016.

Millen became the head coach of the St. Cloud Norsemen in the NAHL in 2020 and is presently coaching there.

Career statistics

Regular season and playoffs

International

Awards and honors

References

External links
 

1964 births
Living people
AHCA Division I men's ice hockey All-Americans
American men's ice hockey centers
Binghamton Rangers players
Calgary Flames players
Dallas Stars players
EHC Visp players
Flint Spirits players
HC Ambrì-Piotta players
HC Lugano players
Ice hockey players from Minnesota
Ice hockey players at the 1984 Winter Olympics
Ice hockey players at the 1988 Winter Olympics
Kalamazoo Wings (1974–2000) players
Kölner Haie players
Los Angeles Kings players
Minnesota Golden Gophers men's ice hockey players
New Jersey Devils players
New York Rangers draft picks
New York Rangers players
Olympic ice hockey players of the United States
People from Cloquet, Minnesota